Whiteson Changwe (19 October 1964 – 27 April 1993) was a Zambian footballer and member of the national team.  He was among those killed in the crash of the team plane in Gabon in 1993.

References

External links

1964 births
1993 deaths
Zambian footballers
Zambia international footballers
1992 African Cup of Nations players
Victims of aviation accidents or incidents in Gabon
Association football defenders
Footballers killed in the 1993 Zambia national football team plane crash